Mogilny is a Slavic masculine surname. Its feminine counterpart is Mogilnaya. It may refer to
Alexander Mogilny (born 1969), Russian ice hockey player
Valentin Mogilny (1965–2015), Soviet artistic gymnast 
Vyacheslav Mogilny (born 1971), Russian-Ukrainian football coach and former player

See also
 

Slavic-language surnames